Redlin is a surname of German origin. Notable people with the surname include:

Rolland W. Redlin (1920–2011), American politician
Terry Redlin (1937–2016), American artist
Redlin Art Center

References

Surnames of German origin